Harizul Izuan Abdul Rani (born 3 March 1982) is a Malaysian footballer. His preferred position is as a midfielder.

Career
Harizul started his professional career in Perak youth squad, however he was dropped for the 2002 season. He joins TNB Kelantan afterwards, but re-joins Perak in the mid-year of 2002. Since then he has been the mainstay of Perak squad, picking up the Premier 1 title in 2002 and 2003, winners of Malaysia FA Cup in 2004 and winners of Malaysia Charity Shield in 2005 and 2006.

After the 2006 season ended, he leaves Perak. He starts a one-team per season sojourn, beginning with Kuala Muda NAZA in 2007, then Perlis FA in 2008, Proton FC in 2009 and finally PBDKT T-Team FC for the 2010 season.

He returns to Perak for the 2011 season. However, he was released at the end of the season.

He had represented Perak in Sukma Games 2002.

National team
Harizul represented the Malaysia SEA Games squad in Southeast Asia Games in 2005. Malaysia won the bronze medal in the Games.

References

External links
 

1982 births
Living people
Malaysian footballers
Perak F.C. players
Perlis FA players
Kuala Muda Naza F.C. players
Malaysian people of Malay descent
Association football midfielders